"Soy Mi Destino" is the first single from Mayré Martínez's debut album of the same name. Recorded in early 2007, it was released in February 2007 and quickly gained heavy radio airplay in Venezuela and Mexico. The song was written by Cuban born and Latin American Idol judge Jon Secada specially for the winner of the show's first season. When the album was released in May 2007, a new version was included, it featured a more guitar-based melody.

Music video

The official music video started rotating on HTV in June 2007. It's a live performance of the song in "El Poliedro de Caracas", located in Venezuela's capital. Footage from the same performance was also used in advertisement for Digitel, one of Venezuela's GSM mobile phone network, being Mayré one of the public images of the company.

2007 singles
Songs written by Jon Secada
2007 songs
Sony BMG Norte singles